Linha do Oeste (Western Line) is a railway line serving the central western coast of Portugal belonging to Infraestruturas de Portugal network. The line was opened in 1887.

Passenger services are operated by CP. The line is used also by freight trains from CP; the new private freight operator Takargo also plans services using this line.

See also 
 List of railway lines in Portugal
 List of Portuguese locomotives and railcars
 History of rail transport in Portugal

References

Sources

External links
Schedule

O
Railway lines opened in 1887
Iberian gauge railways